Kim Mellius Flyvholm Larsen (23 October 1945 – 30 September 2018) was a Danish rock and pop musician. He was a major selling Scandinavian act with over 5 million albums sold.

Career 
Kim Larsen was born in Copenhagen. Inspired by The Beatles and rock and roll, he began as a songwriter and guitarist. The band dissolved in the late 1970s.

In 1979, Larsen participated in the Danish stage of the Eurovision Song Contest with the song "Ud i det blå" (lit.: Out into the blue). He came third out of 17 participants. The song was included on this album 231045-0637.

Around 1980, Larsen moved to New York. He released two albums but was not successful in breaking through in America and returned to Denmark after a few years.

Kim Larsen released a number of solo albums in the 1980s, topping the charts in 1983 with the album Midt om natten (en: In the Middle of the Night). The album more or less became a soundtrack for the movie by the same name based upon it.

In 1983, Larsen founded the band Kim Larsen & Bellami and released four albums until 1992, when after a couple of different line-ups, the band broke up. He then released another solo album, Hvem kan sige nej til en engel (Who Can Say No to an Angel). In the mid-1990s he founded the band Kim Larsen & Kjukken which was based in Odense.

By the end of 2017, Larsen was diagnosed with prostate cancer. This would end up impacting his tour with Kim Larsen & Kjukken who were scheduled for concerts throughout January, February and March 2018. In a Facebook post published to the band's official profile page, Larsen apologised for the inconvenience and explained that he intended to be back playing by the start of the summer.

Larsen died of prostate cancer at his home in Odense on 30 September 2018. A week after his death a large memorial concert was held in Copenhagen with around 35,000 people attending, and major Danish musicians such as Magtens Korridorer, Love Shop, The Minds of 99, and Tim Christensen performing cover versions of Larsen's songs.

Protest singer 
Larsen frequently voiced his opposition to established society and instead advocated the right to be different from the mainstream. The album and movie Midt om natten revolves around this subject – in fact you can compare the movie action to the real Danish BZ movement BZ, Sorte Hest and also Freetown Christiania, located in Copenhagen. The same opposition is also shown by the album 231045-0637 – the title is Kim Larsen's personal identification number which is strictly personal. Larsen was against the big database of every citizen, implied by this title.

Kim Larsen was a heavy smoker, and he was critical of Danish anti-smoking laws. In August 2008, he paid for an advertising campaign which showed the text "Tillykke med rygeforbudet – Gesundheit macht frei !!!". The first sentence means "Congratulations on the smoking ban" in Danish, and the second sentence means "health makes (you) free" in German, a reference to the Nazi phrase Arbeit macht frei. Claiming that smoking bans are made not to protect smokers, but non-smokers, Kim Larsen made a connection between smoking bans and Nazism.

The biography Mine unge år – Kim Larsen (lit.: My young years – Kim Larsen) by writer & journalist Jens Andersen together with Kim Larsen, was incomplete before his death and the book was finished without Kim Larsen.

Bands

Gasolin' (1969–1978) 
 Kim Larsen – Vocals and rhythm guitar
  – Solo guitar
  – Bass
 Bjørn Uglebjerg (1969–1971) and Søren Berlev (1971–1978) – Drums
 Klaus Agerschou (live concerts) – Keyboards

Kim Larsen & Jungledreams (1980–1983) 
 Kim Larsen – Guitar and vocals
 Rick Blakemore – Guitar
 Joe Delia – Keyboards
 Abe Speller – Drums
 Dennis Espantman – Bass

Kim Larsen & Bellami (1983–1992) 

1983–1984:
 Kim Larsen – Guitar and vocals
 Henning Pold – Bass
 Phil Barrett – Keyboards and guitar
 Soren Wolff – Guitar
 Jan Lysdahl – Drums

1986–1992:
 Kim Larsen – Guitar and vocals
 Henning Pold – Bass
 Hans Fagt and Jan Lysdahl – Drums
 Mikkel Håkonsson and Peter Ingemann – Keyboards
 Thomas Grue and Per Rasmussen – Guitars

Kim Larsen & Bell*Star (1993–1995) 
 Kim Larsen – Guitar and vocals
 Hans Fagt – Drums
 Henning Pold – Bass
 Mikkel Håkonsson – Keyboards

Kim Larsen & Kjukken (1995–2018) 
 Kim Larsen – Guitar and vocals
 Bo Gryholt – Bass (1995–2002) and Jesper Haugaard – Bass (2002–2018)
 Karsten Skovgaard – Guitar
 Jesper Rosenqvist – Drums (1994–2014) and Jens Langhorn (2015–2018)
 Jørn Jeppesen – Guitar (2015–2018)

Discography

Solo albums 

Studio
 1973: Værsgo (  (as in serving something))
 1977:  (en: Kim Larsen and the Yankee boys)
 1979: 231045-0637 (Kim Larsen's personal identification number)
 1981: 
 1983: Midt om natten (en: In the middle of the night)
 1994:  (en: Who can say no to an angel?)
 2010: Mine damer og herrer (en: Ladies and gentlemen)
 2019: Sange fra første sal 
EP's
 1982: 5 Eiffel

Compilations
 1975: Skru Op
 1977: Boller Op, Boller Ned
 1979: Hittegods
 1983: Gorilla Mix
 1983: Larsens Bedste
 1984: Årets Koncent
 2015: Kim i 70'erne (with Gasolin')

Live
 1985: Kim i Cirkus (Live) (en: Kim at the Circus)
 2007:  (Live)

With Gasolin' 

Studio
 1971: Gasolin'
 1972: Gasolin' 2
 1973: Gasolin' 3
 1974: Stakkels Jim (en: Poor Jim)
 1975: Gas 5
 1976: Efter endnu en dag (en: After Another Day)
 1977: Gør det noget (en: Does it matter?)
 1978: Killin' Time

Compilations
 1980: Super Mix 1
 1981: A Box Full of Gas
 1984: Det Bedste Fra Mig Og Mine Venner (Kim Larsen with Gasolin')
 1991: Rabalderstræde Forever
 1993: Derudaf Forever
 1997: A Foreign Affair vol.1
 1999: Gasolin' Forever
 2000: The Early Years
 2002: A Foreign Affair vol.2
 2003: The Black Box
 2009: Masser af succes
 2015: Kim I 70'erne

Live
 1976: Live sådan (Live)
 1978: Gøglernes aften (Live)

With Starfuckers 
Live
 1978:  (en: Beware of imitations)

With Kim Larsen & Jungledreams 
Studio
 1982:

With Kim Larsen & Bellami 
Studio
 1986:  (en: Disguised as an adult)
 1988: 
 1989: 
 1992:

With Kim Larsen & Kjukken 

Studio
 1996: 
 1998:  (en: Air below the wings)
 2001: 
 2001:  (en: Forgotten songs)
 2003: 
 2004:  (en: Forgotten songs – Christmas and New Year)
 2006:  (en: Old Tomcat)
 2008:  (en: Forgotten songs for children)
 2012:  (en: Happy world)
 2017:  (en: East of Westway)

Live
 2002:  (en: It was a Thursday evening)
 2007:  (en: A small bag of noise)

Charting albums 
(All peak positions in Danish Albums Chart)
 2001: Weekend Music (reached No. 3)
 2001: Sange fra glemmebogen (reached No. 1)
 2006: Gammel hankat (reached No. 1)
 2008: Glemmebogen for børn (reached No. 1)
 2010: Mine damer og herrer (reached No. 1)
 2012: 5 Eiffel (reached No. 21)
 2015: Guld & grønne skove (reached No. 12)
 2015: Forklædt som voksen (reached No. 14)
As Kim Larsen & Kjukken
 2002: Det var en torsdag aften (reached No. 2)
 2003: 7-9-13 (reached No. 1)
 2004: Glemmebogen Jul & Nytår (reached No. 1)
 2007: En lille pose støj (reached No. 1) (Live)
As Kim Larsen & Bellami
 2015: Kielgasten (reached No. 22)
With Gasolin'
 2015: Kim I 70'erne (reached No. 8)

References

External links 
 Kim Larsen's website
 Kim Larsen's record company
 YT: Tekamaki Sidewalk Stereo Machine

1945 births
2018 deaths
Danish male singers
Danish rock singers
Dansk Melodi Grand Prix contestants
Musicians from Copenhagen